Donald Li (born 1961) is a Chinese actor. He is best known for Big Trouble in Little China and The Avengers. He played multiple parts in Alan Cook's stage adaptation of John Steinbeck's novel East of Eden.

Filmography

Film

Television series

References

External links
 

1961 births
Chinese male film actors
Living people
Hong Kong people